The 2016 World Wheelchair Curling Championship was held from February 21 to 28 at the Eiszentrum Luzern in Lucerne, Switzerland.

Qualification
 (host country)
Top seven teams from the 2015 World Wheelchair Curling Championship:

Two teams from the 2015 World Wheelchair Curling B-Championship

Qualification event

Norway and South Korea qualified for the World Championship from the qualifying event held in November 2015 in Lohja, Finland.

Teams
The teams are listed as follows:

Round-robin standings
Final round-robin standings

Round-robin results
All draw times are listed in Central European Time (UTC+01).

Draw 1
Sunday, February 21, 16:30

Draw 2
Monday, February 22, 10:30

Draw 3
Monday, February 22, 15:30

Draw 4
Tuesday, February 23, 10:30

Draw 5
Tuesday, February 23, 15:30

Draw 6
Wednesday, February 24, 10:30

Draw 7
Wednesday, February 24, 15:30

Draw 8
Thursday, February 25, 10:30

Draw 9
Thursday, February 25, 15:30

Draw 10
Friday, February 26, 10:30

Draw 11
Friday, February 26, 15:30

Draw 12
Saturday, February 27, 9:00

Tiebreaker
Saturday, February 27, 14:00

 is relegated to the 2016 World Wheelchair Curling B-Championship

Playoffs

1 vs. 2
Saturday, February 27, 19:00

3 vs. 4
Saturday, February 27, 19:00

Semifinal
Sunday, February 28, 10:00

Bronze medal game
Sunday, February 28, 15:00

Gold medal game
Sunday, February 28, 15:00

References

External links

World Wheelchair Curling Championship
World Wheelchair Curling Championship
World Wheelchair Curling Championship
International sports competitions hosted by Switzerland
International curling competitions hosted by Switzerland
Sport in Lucerne